Ensign (Late Middle English, from Old French , from Latin  (plural)) is a junior rank of a commissioned officer in the armed forces of some countries, normally in the infantry or navy. As the junior officer in an infantry regiment was traditionally the carrier of the ensign flag, the rank acquired the name. This rank has generally been replaced in army ranks by second lieutenant. Ensigns were generally the lowest-ranking commissioned officer, except where the rank of subaltern existed. In contrast, the Arab rank of ensign, لواء, liwa', derives from the command of units with an ensign, not the carrier of such a unit's ensign, and is today the equivalent of a major general.

In Thomas Venn's 1672 Military and Maritime Discipline in Three Books, the duties of ensigns are to include not only carrying the color but assisting the captain and lieutenant of a company and in their absence, have their authority.

"Ensign" is enseigne in French, and chorąży in Polish, each of which derives from a term for a flag. The Spanish alférez and Portuguese alferes is a junior officer rank below lieutenant associated with carrying the flag, and so is often translated as "ensign". Unlike the rank in other languages, its etymology has nothing to do with flags, but instead comes from the Arabic for "cavalier" or "knight". Fähnrich in German comes from an older German military title, Fahnenträger (flag bearer); however, it is an officer cadet rank, not a junior officer – the same applies to the Dutch vaandrig, which has a parallel etymology. In the German Landsknecht armies (c. 1480), the equivalent rank of cornet existed for those men who carried the troop standard (known as a "cornet"). It is still used in the artillery and cavalry units of the Netherlands (kornet).

Estonia 
In Estonian Defence Forces the equivalent of “ensign” is lipnik. It is used mainly as a rank for reserve officers.

French speaking countries 

During the Ancien Régime in France, as in other countries, the ensign (enseigne) was the banner of an infantry regiment. As in other countries, the name began to be used for the officers who carried the ensign. It was renamed sub-lieutenant (sous-lieutenant) at the end of the 18th century.
The Navy used a rank of ship-of-the-line ensign (enseigne de vaisseau), which was the first officer rank. It was briefly renamed ship-of-the-line sub-lieutenant (sous-lieutenant de vaisseau) in the end of the 18th century, but its original name was soon restored.

Within many French speaking countries, the rank is still used in the naval forces. The ranks are usually split into a first and second class ( and  respectively).

New Zealand
The Royal New Zealand Navy, unlike the Royal Navy – whose uniforms, insignia, and traditions it inherited – created the ensign grade to equal the lowest commissioned RNZAF grade of pilot officer and the New Zealand Army grade of second lieutenant. It ranks above the grade of midshipman. Like the grade of pilot officer, it uses a single thin strip of braid.

The fact that the Royal Navy has no real equivalent to the lowest commissioned Royal Air Force and British Army grades was one of the driving factors behind the RNZN's decision to create the ensign grade. Another was that, at the time, New Zealand was actively involved with the United States Armed Forces, so it made sense to balance the rank system out with that used by the United States Navy.

United Kingdom
Until 1871, when it was replaced by second lieutenant, ensign was the lowest rank of commissioned officer in infantry regiments of the British Army (except fusilier and rifle regiments, and the Marines, which always used second lieutenant). It was the duty of officers of this rank to carry the colours of the regiment.  In the 16th century, "ensign" was corrupted into "ancient", and was used in the two senses of a banner and the bearer of the banner. Today, the term "ensign" is still used by the Foot Guards regiments, for instance during the ceremony of trooping the colour. The equivalent cavalry rank was cornet, also being derived from the name of a banner.

United States

Army
The rank of ensign was established in the U.S. Army by the act of September 29; 1789, (the first act of legislation after the adoption of the U.S. Constitution); each of the eight companies in the Regiment of Infantry was authorized one captain, one lieutenant and one ensign. With the passage of the act of April 30, 1790, the number of companies in the regiment of infantry was increased to 12 and each of the companies was authorized the same number of officers. The act of March 3, 1791 added a second regiment to the Army strength, doubling the total number of ensigns.

With the organization of the Legion of the United States authorized by the act of March 5, 1792, ensigns were retained in the companies of infantry and were included in the authorized strength of companies of rifles; in addition, cornets were added to the companies of dragoons.

The ranks of ensign and cornet were abolished in the United States Army in the Army Organization Act of 1815.

Navy
In the United States Navy, the rank of ensign superseded passed midshipman in 1862. Ensign is the junior commissioned officer rank in the United States Navy, the United States Coast Guard, the United States Public Health Service Commissioned Corps, and the National Oceanic and Atmospheric Administration Commissioned Officer Corps. This rank is also used in the U.S. Maritime Service and the U.S. Naval Sea Cadet Corps. Ensign ranks below lieutenant junior grade, and it is equivalent to a second lieutenant in the U.S. Army, the Marine Corps, and the Air Force.

Where a newly commissioned ensign is assigned in the Navy is dependent on status as either an unrestricted line, restricted line, or staff corps officer.  For unrestricted line officers, depending on assignment to which warfare community, prospective Surface Warfare Officers (SWO) will spend 22 weeks at Surface Warfare Officer School followed by assignment to a warship for qualification as a SWO. Prospective Submarine Warfare Officers will attend Naval Nuclear Power School for 26 weeks, followed by Nuclear Power Training Unit (Prototype) for 24 weeks and Submarine Officer Basic Course for 12 weeks before reporting to their first submarine.  Prospective Naval Aviators and Naval Flight Officers have a 12 to 18 month flight training track to earn their wings, followed by a six to nine-month training track in a Fleet Replacement Squadron before being assigned to fly combat aircraft in a deployable Fleet aviation squadron.  Sea-Air-Land (SEAL) Special Warfare Officers attend a 6-month Basic Underwater Demolition/SEAL (BUD/S) course followed by a 4-month SEAL Qualification Training (SQT) course before assignment to a SEAL Team.  Finally, Special Operations Officers, primarily Explosive Ordnance Disposal (EOD) / Diver officers will have a training track similar in length to that of SEAL officers, to include schools for EOD, SCUBA, hard hat diving, airborne (parachutists) and combat arms skills training before assignment to their first operational assignment.

Restricted Line officers, depending on designator, may train, qualify and be assigned as naval intelligence officers, naval cryptographic officers, aircraft maintenance duty officers, meteorologists/oceanographers, information professionals, human resources professionals, public affairs officers, or a host of other specialties.

Still others may become staff corps officers in the Supply Corps, Civil Engineering Corps, Nurse Corps, Medical Service Corps, or be law school students or medical or dental school students in the Judge Advocate General's Corps, Medical Corps or Dental Corps, respectively.

Coast Guard
While the Coast Guard does not categorize its officers as unrestricted line, restricted line or staff corps, a similar career sorting and training process also takes place, ranging from those in operational fields such as cuttermen aboard Coast Guard cutters, Naval Aviators in Coast Guard Aviation, specialists in maritime safety and inspections, and a host of other Coast Guard officer career fields.
 
All ensigns will become branch officers or division officers in their first operational assignments, responsible for leading a group of petty officers and enlisted men in one of the ship's, squadrons, team's or other organization's branches and divisions (for example, engineering, navigation, communications, sensors or weapons aboard a warship, or similar functions in the operations, aircraft maintenance, administrative or safety/NATOPS departments in a flying squadron) while at the same time receiving on-the-job training in leadership, naval systems, programs, and policies from higher-ranking officers and from senior enlisted men and women in the Chief Petty Officer rates.

Navy and Coast Guard ensigns wear collar insignia of a single gold bar and because of this share the nickname "butterbars" with Army, Air Force, and Marine Corps second lieutenants, who wear the same insignia.

Public Health Service Commissioned Corps
In the United States Public Health Service Commissioned Corps – a uniformed service in the United States Public Health Service — those wearing the rank of ensign are part of a commissioned officer student training, and extern program (COSTEP), either junior, for those with more than a year remaining of education in a commissionable degree (JRCOSTEP), or senior, for those within one year of graduating with a commissionable degree (SRCOSTEP). Some officers may hold a permanent rank of ensign based on their experience and education, but then can hold the temporary rank of lieutenant, junior grade.

NOAA Corps
In the National Oceanic and Atmospheric Administration Commissioned Officer Corps (NOAA Corps) – a uniformed service in the National Oceanic and Atmospheric Administration — ensign is the most junior rank. All NOAA Corps officers become ensigns via direct commissions.

Gallery

French-speaking countries

See also
 U.S. Navy officer rank insignia
 Comparative military ranks
 Sub-lieutenant
 Signifer
 Vexillarius

References

Division Officer's Guide. James Stavridis and Robert Girrier. Naval Institute Press, 2004. .

External links
 The Definition of Ensigns – Chapter I.

Military ranks
Military ranks of Germany
Military ranks of the British Army
Military ranks of the United States Coast Guard
Military ranks of the United States Navy
Naval ranks